The fuselage (from the French fuselé "spindle-shaped") is an aircraft's main body section. It holds crew, passengers, or cargo. In single-engine aircraft, it will usually contain an engine as well, although in some amphibious aircraft the single engine is mounted on a pylon attached to the fuselage, which in turn is used as a floating hull. The fuselage also serves to position the control and stabilization surfaces in specific relationships to lifting surfaces, which is required for aircraft stability and maneuverability.

Types of structures

Truss structure 

This type of structure is still in use in many lightweight aircraft using welded steel tube trusses.
A box truss fuselage structure can also be built out of wood—often covered with plywood. Simple box structures may be rounded by the addition of supported lightweight stringers, allowing the fabric covering to form a more aerodynamic shape, or one more pleasing to the eye.

Geodesic construction 

Geodesic structural elements were used by Barnes Wallis for British Vickers between the wars and into World War II to form the whole of the fuselage, including its aerodynamic shape. In this type of construction multiple flat strip stringers are wound about the formers in opposite spiral directions, forming a basket-like appearance. This proved to be light, strong, and rigid and had the advantage of being made almost entirely of wood. A similar construction using aluminum alloy was used in the Vickers Warwick with less material than would be required for other structural types. The geodesic structure is also redundant and so can survive localized damage without catastrophic failure. A fabric covering over the structure completed the aerodynamic shell (see the Vickers Wellington for an example of a large warplane which uses this process). The logical evolution of this is the creation of fuselages using molded plywood, in which multiple sheets are laid with the grain in differing directions to give the monocoque type below.

Monocoque shell 

In this method, the exterior surface of the fuselage is also the primary structure. A typical early form of this (see the Lockheed Vega) was built using molded plywood, where the layers of plywood are formed over a "plug" or within a mold. A later form of this structure uses fiberglass cloth impregnated with polyester or epoxy resin as the skin, instead of plywood. A simple form of this used in some amateur-built aircraft uses rigid expanded foam plastic as the core, with a fiberglass covering, eliminating the necessity of fabricating molds, but requiring more effort in finishing (see the Rutan VariEze). An example of a larger molded plywood aircraft is the de Havilland Mosquito fighter/light bomber of World War II.
No plywood-skin fuselage is truly monocoque, since stiffening elements are incorporated into the structure to carry concentrated loads that would otherwise buckle the thin skin.
The use of molded fiberglass using negative ("female") molds (which give a nearly finished product) is prevalent in the series production of many modern sailplanes. The use of molded composites for fuselage structures is being extended to large passenger aircraft such as the Boeing 787 Dreamliner (using pressure-molding on female molds).

Semi-monocoque 

This is the preferred method of constructing an all-aluminum fuselage. First, a series of frames in the shape of the fuselage cross sections are held in position on a rigid fixture. These frames are then joined with lightweight longitudinal elements called stringers. These are in turn covered with a skin of sheet aluminum, attached by riveting or by bonding with special adhesives. The fixture is then disassembled and removed from the completed fuselage shell, which is then fitted out with wiring, controls, and interior equipment such as seats and luggage bins. Most modern large aircraft are built using this technique, but use several large sections constructed in this fashion which are then joined with fasteners to form the complete fuselage. As the accuracy of the final product is determined largely by the costly fixture, this form is suitable for series production, where many identical aircraft are to be produced. Early examples of this type include the Douglas Aircraft DC-2 and DC-3 civil aircraft and the Boeing B-17 Flying Fortress. Most metal light aircraft are constructed using this process.

Both monocoque and semi-monocoque are referred to as "stressed skin" structures as all or a portion of the external load (i.e. from wings and empennage, and from discrete masses such as the engine) is taken by the surface covering. In addition, all the load from internal pressurization is carried (as skin tension) by the external skin.

The proportioning of loads between the components is a design choice dictated largely by the dimensions, strength, and elasticity of the components available for construction and whether or not a design is intended to be "self jigging", not requiring a complete fixture for alignment.

Materials 

Early aircraft were constructed of wood frames covered in fabric. As monoplanes became popular, metal frames improved the strength, which eventually led to all-metal-structure aircraft, with metal covering for all its exterior surfaces - this was first pioneered in the second half of 1915. Some modern aircraft are constructed with composite materials for major control surfaces, wings, or the entire fuselage such as the Boeing 787. On the 787, it makes possible higher pressurization levels and larger windows for passenger comfort as well as lower weight to reduce operating costs. The Boeing 787 weighs  less than if it were an all-aluminum assembly.

Windows 

They are usually composed of three layers or plies, of glass or plastic : the inner two are 8 mm (0.3 in.) thick each and are structural, while the outer ply, about 3 mm thick, is a barrier against foreign object damage and abrasion, with often a hydrophobic coating. This was previously done with thin wires similar to a rear car window but is now accomplished with a transparent, nanometers-thick coating of indium tin oxide sitting between plies, electrically conductive and thus transmitting heat. Curved glass improves aerodynamics but sight criteria also needs larger panes. A cockpit windshield is composed of 4–6 panels, 35 kg (77 lb) each on an Airbus A320. In its lifetime, an average aircraft goes through three or four windshields, and the market is shared evenly between OEM and higher margins aftermarket.

Cabin windows, made from much lighter than glass stretched acrylic glass, consists of multiple panes: an outer one built to support four times the maximum cabin pressure, an inner one for redundancy and a scratch pane near the passenger. Acrylic is susceptible to crazing : a network of fine cracks appears but can be polished to restore optical transparency, removal and polishing typically undergo every 2–3 years for uncoated windows.

Wing integration 
"Flying wing" aircraft, such as the Northrop YB-49 Flying Wing and the Northrop B-2 Spirit bomber have no separate fuselage; instead what would be the fuselage is a thickened portion of the wing structure.

Conversely, there have been a small number of aircraft designs which have no separate wing, but use the fuselage to generate lift. Examples include National Aeronautics and Space Administration's experimental lifting body designs and the Vought XF5U-1 Flying Flapjack.

A blended wing body can be considered a mixture of the above. It carries the useful load in a fuselage producing lift. A modern example is Boeing X-48. One of the earliest aircraft using this design approach is Burnelli CBY-3, which fuselage was airfoil shaped to produce lift.

Gallery

See also 
 Aeronautics
 Airframe
 Empennage
 Nose art
 Aviation accidents and incidents

References

External links

NASA page on fuselage
Institute of Aircraft Design and Lightweight Structures (IFL)
 
 

Aircraft components